Rubus ucetanus is a rare North American species of flowering plants in the rose family. It is found only near Tampa Bay in the state of Florida in the southeastern United States.

The genetics of Rubus is extremely complex, so that it is difficult to decide on which groups should be recognized as species. There are many rare species with limited ranges such as this. Further study is suggested to clarify the taxonomy.

References

ucetanus
Plants described in 1925
Endemic flora of Florida
Flora without expected TNC conservation status